Antricola delacruzi is a species of soft shell ticks in the family Argasidae. Like Nothoaspis, another genus in the same family, Antricola species infest cave-dwelling bats. A. delacruzi exclusively parasites insectivorous cave-dwelling bats of the Pteronotus genus, and are only parasitic in larva form, and are non-parasitic as adults.  In both adult and larva form the primary food source appears to be bat guano, although the exact component of the guano that is consumed remains unclear. They are indigenous to the Brazilian rain forest.

References 

Ticks
Parasites of bats
Invertebrates of Brazil
Argasidae
Animals described in 2004